Middleberg (sometimes spelled "Middleburg") is an unincorporated community in Grady County, Oklahoma, United States, located on the old alignment of US Highway 62 between Blanchard and Chickasha.

Middleberg was originally a stop on the Oklahoma Central Railroad (aka "the OCR") but today is a rural community.

According to locals, there are two possible explanations for the community's name, either that it got its name because is in the middle of the route between Chickasha and Blanchard, or alternatively that it was named for Gerritt Middleberg, a representative of the Dutch investors of the OCR.

Public school students in Middleberg attend Middleberg Schools through the eighth grade, after which they attend high school in nearby Blanchard.

Other community institutions include the Middleberg Baptist Church.

References

Unincorporated communities in Grady County, Oklahoma
Unincorporated communities in Oklahoma